Odontarthria ochrivenella is a species of snout moth in the genus Odontarthria. It was described by Ragonot in 1893, and is known from Brazil.

References

Moths described in 1893
Phycitinae
Taxa named by Émile Louis Ragonot